Pls Like is a BBC television satirical mockumentary, produced by Left Bank Pictures and screened on BBC Three online in 2017.  A second series followed in 2018 and a third in 2021. The first series starred Liam Williams as himself, in a quest to be a successful YouTube vlogger.

Each series consists of six episodes each. Episodes length varies between 15 and 18 minutes.

Reception
Tristram Fane Saunders of The Daily Telegraph said the first series was "impeccably cast, sharply observed." Hannah J Davies of The Guardian said: "it puts a mirror up to the fads and controversies of the day, whether that’s ASMR or the alt-right, and explores their potential for laughs and pathos"

Pls Like was nominated for Best Short Form Programme at the 2018 British Academy Television Awards and was shortlisted for Best Digital Fiction Series at the Banff World Media Festival in Canada.

Episodes

Series 1 (2017)

Series 2 (2018)

Series 3 (2021)

References

External links

BBC Television shows
2017 British television series debuts
2010s British sitcoms
2020s British sitcoms
BBC television sitcoms
English-language television shows
Television series by Endemol
Television series by Left Bank Pictures